Solomon Sunaone Mamaloni (23 January 1944 – 11 January 2000) was a Solomon Islands politician. He was the first Chief Minister of the islands, and later served as Prime Minister for three spells in the 1980s and 1990s.

Biography
Mamaloni was born in 1944 in the village of Rumahui, Arosi, in West Makira. He was educated at Pawa School and King George VI Secondary School, before attending Te Aute College in New Zealand. He joined the civil service in 1966, initially working as an executive officer for the Legislative Council, before becoming a clerk.

He was elected to the Governing Council from the Makira constituency in the 1970 elections. After being re-elected in 1973, he was involved in the establishment of the People's Progressive Party the following January. Later in 1974 the new post of Chief Minister was established, with Mamaloni being elected to the post after the sixth round of voting.

He served as Chief Minister of the Solomon Islands until July 1976. Although he resigned from the Legislative Assembly in December 1976, he returned to politics and  represented West Makira constituency in the National Parliament. He was Leader of the Opposition from 1980 to 1981, from 1984 to 1988, and from 1993 to 1994. He was again chosen as Leader of the Opposition in late September 1998, replacing Job Dudley Tausinga.

His role as architect of the Solomon Islands' independence from British rule in 1978 buoyed Mamaloni's support, and he served as opposition leader until his death.

He remained Opposition Leader until his death from kidney disease in a Honiara hospital in January 2000. His funeral was held on 13 January.

References

External links
worldstatesmen.org: Solomon Islands

1944 births
People educated at Te Aute College
Solomon Islands civil servants
Prime Ministers of the Solomon Islands
Finance Ministers of the Solomon Islands
Leaders of the Opposition (Solomon Islands)
Members of the Governing Council of the Solomon Islands
Members of the Legislative Assembly of the Solomon Islands
Members of the National Parliament of the Solomon Islands
Deaths from kidney disease
People's Progressive Party (Solomon Islands) politicians
2000 deaths